Lire Phiri is a Mosotho footballer who currently plays as a midfielder for Lesotho Defence Force. Since 2003, he has won four caps for the Lesotho national football team.

In 2000-01 he was the top scorer in the Lesotho Premier League.

External links
 

Living people
Association football midfielders
Lesotho footballers
Lesotho international footballers
Year of birth missing (living people)